The Miss Montana Teen USA competition is the pageant that selects the representative for the state of Montana in the Miss Teen USA pageant. From 1994 to 2007, it was directed by Carol Hirata and the Carlton Group, based in Bellvue, Colorado. In 2013, it was taken by Pageants NW Productions based in Puyallup, Washington.

Montana is the least successful state at Miss Teen USA, placing only once in 2006 by Katie Blair from Billings, who went on to win the title Miss Teen USA 2006.

Julia Kunau of Lewistown was crowned Miss Montana Teen USA 2022 on September 12, 2021 at Red Lion Hotel Templin's on the River in Post Falls, Idaho. Kunau will represent Montana for the title of Miss Teen USA 2022.

Results summary

Placements
Miss Teen USAs: Katie Blair (2006)
Montana holds a record of 1 placement at Miss Teen USA.

Winners 

1 Age at the time of the Miss Teen USA pageant

References

External links
Official website

Montana
Women in Montana